"Dis-Satisfied" is a single by American country music artists Bill Anderson and Jan Howard.  Released in September 1971, it was the second single and from their album Bill and Jan (Or Jan and Bill). The song reached #4 on the Billboard Hot Country Singles chart. The single became the duo's final major hit and charting single. The song additionally peaked at #11 on the Canadian RPM Country Tracks chart.

Chart performance

References 

1971 singles
Bill Anderson (singer) songs
Jan Howard songs
Songs written by Bill Anderson (singer)
Songs written by Jan Howard
Song recordings produced by Owen Bradley
1970 songs
Decca Records singles